Charmion King (July 25, 1925 – January 6, 2007) was a Canadian actress.

Born in Toronto, Ontario, she was part of the country's burgeoning theatre and television industry in the decade of the 1950s. Fresh out of the University of Toronto's Hart House, she quickly became known for her fresh beauty and roles at the new Crest Theatre and their Straw Hat Players summer circuit in the Muskoka Lake district.

She went on to the Stratford Festival appearing in productions of The Winter's Tale, Three Sisters and Uncle Vanya, and appeared on Broadway in Tyrone Guthrie's production of Love and Libel.

She also acted in notable television films, including Anne of Green Gables (as Josephine Barry) and Jackie, Ethel, Joan: The Women of Camelot (as Rose Fitzgerald Kennedy). She also starred in the Canadian television series Wind at My Back and House of Pride. In 1988 she appeared in the film Shadow Dancing.

Family
She was married to actor Gordon Pinsent for 44 years. Their daughter, Leah Pinsent, is also a noted Canadian television actress.

Death
King died, aged 81, in Toronto, reportedly from complications of emphysema.

Filmography

Film

Television

External links

Toronto Star obituary

1925 births
2007 deaths
Actresses from Toronto
Canadian film actresses
Canadian stage actresses
Canadian television actresses
Canadian Shakespearean actresses